Mucin-7 is a protein that in humans is encoded by the MUC7 gene. In animals, the MUC7 gene is found in most placental mammals, but not marsupials.

Human variations
Humans carry either a five or six tandem repeat version of the gene. In other primates, the number of repeats found is 4-5 for gorillas, 5 for chimpanzees, 6-7 for orangutans, 8-10 for macaques, 10-11 for baboons and 11-12 for green monkeys.

References

Further reading 

 
 
 
 
 
 
 
 
 
 
 
 
 
 
 

07